Nerissus hispidulus is a species of leaf beetle of the Democratic Republic of the Congo and Ivory Coast, described by Édouard Lefèvre in 1886.

References 

Eumolpinae
Beetles of Africa
Beetles of the Democratic Republic of the Congo
Insects of West Africa
Taxa named by Édouard Lefèvre
Beetles described in 1886